Camilio Lorenzo Iglesias (7 August 1940 – 13 July 2020) was a Spanish Catholic bishop.

Lorenzo Iglesias was born in Spain and was ordained to the priesthood in 1966. He served as bishop of the Diocese of Astorga, Spain, from 1995 until 2015.

Notes

1940 births
2020 deaths
Bishops of Astorga